Carinascincus palfreymani, known commonly as the Pedra Branca skink, as well as the Palfreyman's window-eyed skink, the Pedra Branca cool-skink, or the red-throated skink, is a species of skink in the family Scincidae.  The species is endemic to Australia, and is restricted to the windswept Pedra Branca, an island off southern Tasmania of only 2.5 ha (6.2 acres), where it is dependent on the seabird colonies. It is the only lizard species found on the island.

Etymology
The specific name, palfreymani, is in honor of Mr. A.E. Palfreyman who collected the first specimens of this species.

Description
Adults are a glossy charcoal colour, while juveniles are more lightly coloured.

Biology
The Pedra Branca skink feeds on small invertebrates such as insects, spiders and isopods. It has also been observed to feed on fish scraps dropped or regurgitated by seabirds on the island, and to feed as well on seabird eggs. However, these foods are only available to the skink on a seasonal basis.

There are six separate colonies of the Pedra Branca skink on the island with a total population that fluctuates between 250 and 600 lizards, depending on food availability. The skink is preyed upon by silver gulls. The movement of silver gull colonies into areas where the skinks are living has recently led to the decline of some skink colonies.

Pedra Branca skinks live in crevices in the rocks, which provide protection from wind, salt spray and waves. Adult skinks defend their burrows against intrusion by other skinks. However, they are only active when air temperatures are above 15 °C (59 °F).

The Pedra Branca skink is a long-lived species. They do not mature until they are about 6 to 8 years of age. They can live at least 10 years, possibly up to 15 years.

Like most endemic Tasmanian skinks, the Pedra Branca skink bears live young.

Status
C. palfreymani is considered to be vulnerable due to the restricted range and multiple threats including seabird predation, fluctuations in the food supply, climate change and the threat of invasion by introduced predators such as rats.

References

Further reading
Rawlinson PA (1974). "Revision of the endemic southeastern Australian lizard genus Pseudemoia (Scincidae: Lygosominae)". Memoirs of the National Museum of Victoria 35: 87-96. (Pseudemoia palfreymani, new species, p. 92).

External links
 https://web.archive.org/web/20180328191003/http://parks.tas.gov.au/index.aspx?base=5400 photo of Pedra Branca skink.

Carinascincus
Skinks of Australia
Endemic fauna of Tasmania
Reptiles of Tasmania
South West Tasmania
Vulnerable fauna of Australia
Reptiles described in 1974
Taxa named by Peter Alan Rawlinson
Taxonomy articles created by Polbot